Ana Rosa Guy Galego (born June 18, 1942 in Promissão)  is a Brazilian actress.

Biography 

Ana Rosa was born in New Horizon Theater Circus in the city of Promissão, São Paulo. The circus belonged to Captain Pepper Juvenal, his grandfather, and was the birthplace of his first artistic experience: the fifteenth day of life, little Ana Rosa was brought on stage during the presentation of theatrical spectacle "The world does not want me," in which represented a newborn baby abandoned. From there, follow the footsteps of her family and four years old, has played her character with the first lines. At nine years old, also has operations in theater, the actress also worked doing trapeze and numbers on the wire.

In 1958, he met the actor Dedé Santana, who became her first husband and father of her first two children. With Dede, toured as a dancer working with the Royal Circus Magazine. In 1960, Ana Rosa Santana and Dede Dawn opened the TV, in Brasília. At the time, appeared together, live circus acts and various teleteatros. After one year, were rushed to São Paulo, where Mauritius, the couple's first child, died of leukemia on February 14, 1961. In the same year, she and Ana Dede separated and went to Santos, where he returned to work in circus. Months later, the couple resumed and in April 1962, his first born daughter, Maria Leone, now 45 years. Some time later the couple separated for good. Ana Rosa had a total of eight children.

Also in the 1960s, Ana Rosa worked or revues with names like J. Maia, Fernando D'Avilla, Guinter Americo & Cole, Augusto Cesar Vanucci.

Starred in "Between blondes and brunettes," show that premiered in 1961 at the Teatro Jardel, in Copacabana, Rio de Janeiro.

In November 1962, Cole toured the Northeast with the show "Skins and naked." At the time he met the actor Guilherme Corrêa, who became her second husband. In 1964 were living in Porto Alegre.

During the 1970, 1980 and 1990, reconciled his work on TV with theater as "a window to the sun" and "The enemies do not send flowers," both of Peter Bloch, "The marginalized" by Wilbur Pereira de Almeida in Co. Dercy Gonçalves, "Physician to the force" by Molière, "If" by Sergio Jockyman; "round beds, couples square", directed by José Renato, "The shoes" of Millor Fernandes, directed Maurice Vaneau, "The Nonna", directed by Flavio, "Dona Rosita the single," Frederico Garcia Lorca, "Amor Brujo", directed by Roney Villela, "Defect and just start scratching," which was four years, "the wolves", directed by Pedro Antonio Borges. With invitation of Walmor Chagas, the actress joined the permanent cast of Theatre Ziembinsky (Rio de Janeiro), where he played texts as "Dear Friend" by Carlos Drummond de Andrade.

His career is intertwined with the history of Brazilian television. In 1964 he received the invitation of Cassian Gabus Mendes, then artistic director of TV Tupi, to star Alma Cigana. The novel was the first station's recorded on videotape and broadcast daily in prime time, soon became a great success.

After the excellent audience on his next novel, If the sea tell, the actress joined the cast of the TV show.

During a period of separation Guilherme Correa, Ana Rosa Jose Ricardo adopted in 1966, Marie Louise, and twins Joseph and Maria Leticia Rodrigo in 1971. In 1975, William Cooke moved back to St. Paul and the two resumed their marriage. In 1976, the first born daughter, Ana Luisa, who died at age 18 hit in 1994. At this time converted to spiritualism. In 1979, Anna and William were married officially. In 1981, Ana Beatriz was born, the youngest of eight siblings.

Ana Rosa worked at TV Tupi for 16 years, where he appeared in 28 productions and numerous soap operas, such as Vanguard TV, Comedy TV, Grand Theatre Tupi, among others. The actress belonged to the cast of the channel until January 1980 when the station failed.

Over those 40 years of career, Ana Rosa was also a pioneer working on other stations. In January 1982, by Sílvio Santos was invited to star in Destino, the first telenovela of SBT. The actress also appeared in productions of the former Network Headline, among which the novel Antonio Maria, production that opened in 1985, the studios of TV headline in Agua Grande, Rio de Janeiro.

Rede Globo, Ana Rosa made his debut in the miniseries Moinhos de Vento (1983), directed by Walter Avancini. At the station, the actress appeared in over 14 productions, including performances in Caso Verdade, Brava Gente, Você Decide, Retrato de Mulher and A Grande Família "as Genevieve, his girlfriend Blossom (Rogério Cardoso).

On television, Ana Rosa worked with directors such as Geraldo Vietri, Cassiano Gabus Mendes, Antônio Abujamra, Lima Duarte, Walter Avancini, Denis Carvalho, Paulo Ubiratan, Luiz Fernando Carvalho, Daniel Filho, Ricardo Waddington, Jayme Monjardim, Marcos Paulo, among others.

In 1997, along with William Correa made the adaptation of the book "Violets in the Window" by Vera Lucia de Carvalho Marinzeck to the theater and participated in its production. The show, which was watched by more than 156,000 people, still touring in Brazil. In 1998, Ana Rosa also took the challenge to run the show "The Chico Xavier Candide," which also remains to this day touring the country.

Also in 1997, the actress entered the Guinness Book as the record for number of jobs in soap operas recorded on videotape. As actor, supporting or cameo, Ana Rosa keeps that record today.
Ana Rosa also acted in movies, where he worked on such films as Four Brazilians in Paris (1965), The Diabolical Heirs (1966), The Small World of Mark (1968), Geraldo Vietri, and Four Gunmen in Fury (1972), Edward Freund.

In the years that Ana Rosa completed its four-decade career as an actress, she celebrated with the release of "This Mad TV and its Wonderful People" (Publisher Butterfly), which has its history and recalls their striking passages and curious stories lived on TV with testimonials from various artists and professionals.

The actress was widow, February 2, 2006, actor William Correa and lives with her youngest daughter Ana Beatriz Correa in Barra da Tijuca, Rio de Janeiro in the capital.

Career

References

External links 

1942 births
Living people
Brazilian telenovela actresses
Brazilian film actresses
Brazilian stage actresses